Trybesmen (also known as Da Trybe) is an African hip-hop group from Lagos, Nigeria.  The Nigerian newspaper NEXT describes them as "one of the pioneers of hip hop in Nigeria" and the BBC called the group "legendary" in 2005.

The three original members, known as Eldee, Kaboom and Freestyle, first met in 1994 in Lagos. Their first album, L.A.G Style Volume 1., was released in 1999 to positive reviews.  Their hits included "Trybal Marks" and "Shake Bodi."  Two members, eLDee and Freestyle, recorded solo albums after the group broke up.  They reunited to perform at an awards ceremony in Abuja in 2009.

Members

Current members

 Eldee
 OlaDELe
 TKO

Former members
 Freestyle
 KaBoom

Trybesmen Solo Label
Eldee: Trybe Records

Discography

Albums
2000: L.A.G Style

Singles
Trybal Marks
Shake Bodi

Notes

External links
 www.trybesmen.com Former homepage, copy at the Internet Archive (as of December 2003)
 L.A.G Style Album
 Trybesmen

Musical groups established in 2000
Nigerian hip hop groups
Musical groups from Lagos